Pietro Mattia Stancovich (Petar Matija Stanković) (Barban, February 24, 1771 – Barban, September 12, 1852) was an Italian priest, historian and inventor, born in Istria.

Biography 
He studied theology in Padua, was ordained in Pula and then appointed a canon in Barban. He self-published a total of twenty books, including a biography of prominent Istrians. Stancovic was also an inventor, constructing a sowing plow and two devices intended for the processing of olives (the spolpoliva and torchioliva). He wrote a treatise about his inventions, published in 1840. In Rovinj there is a library containing thousands of his books, called the Stancoviciana.

References

External links
 

19th-century Italian historians
1771 births
1852 deaths